This is a list of people who have served as Lord Lieutenant of Kerry.

There were lieutenants of counties in Ireland until the reign of James II, when they were renamed governors. The office of Lord Lieutenant was recreated on 23 August 1831 and incorporated the previous position of Custos Rotulorum of Kerry.

Governors

 Charles Wilmot, 1st Viscount Wilmot: 1605–>1615 
 Maurice Crosbie, 1st Baron Brandon: 1747–1753
 Francis Thomas-Fitzmaurice, 3rd Earl of Kerry
 John Crosbie, 2nd Earl of Glandore: 1790–1815
 James Crosbie: 1803–1831

Lord Lieutenants
The 2nd Earl of Kenmare: 7 October 1831 – 31 October 1853
Henry Arthur Herbert: 22 November 1854 – 26 February 1866
The 4th Earl of Kenmare: 24 March 1866 – 9 February 1905
The 5th Earl of Kenmare: 4 May 1905 – 1922

References

Kerry